Boyle Travers Finniss (18 August 1807 – 24 December 1893) was the first premier of South Australia, serving from 24 October 1856 to 20 August 1857.

Early life
Finniss was born at sea off the Cape of Good Hope, Southern Africa, and lived in Madras, British India. He was later sent to Greenwich, England, for his education. He later entered the Royal Military College, Sandhurst, placing first of sixteen candidates at the entrance examination. In 1825 he became an ensign in the 88th Regiment of Foot, was promoted lieutenant in 1827 to the 56th (West Essex) Regiment of Foot, and then spent three years in Mauritius in the department of roads and bridges.

Surveyor
In 1835 Finniss sold off his commission and, having been appointed assistant surveyor under surveyor-general Colonel William Light, arrived in South Australia in September 1836. He supported Light's choice of the site of Adelaide and assisted in laying out the city; his correspondence during the early years shows him to have been a man of good judgment and he was an able assistant during the surveys.

Finniss joined Light in a private surveying firm, Light, Finniss & Co. While in private enterprise, Light and Finniss surveyed several towns, including Glenelg and Gawler. He also had several other business interests, but they eventually all failed, and he returned to the public service.

Public service and political career
In 1839, Finniss was appointed deputy surveyor-general. In 1843, he became Commissioner of the South Australia Police and a police magistrate. In 1847, he was made Treasurer of South Australia and registrar general; in 1851, was nominated to the South Australian Legislative Council by the governor Sir Henry Young.

In 1852 he was appointed Colonial Secretary of South Australia, and in July 1853 had charge of the bill to provide for two chambers in the South Australian parliament. In the interim between the departure of Governor Young in December 1854 and the arrival of Sir Richard Graves McDonnell in June 1855, Finniss acted as administrator. The bill of 1853 was rejected by the British government, and a new bill was brought forward in 1855 providing for two purely elective houses. This received the royal assent in 1856.

Finniss was elected one of the representatives for the city of Adelaide and became the first premier and Chief Secretary of South Australia. There were early difficulties between the two houses but Finniss, during the four months his ministry was in session, succeeded in passing measures to deal with waterworks for Adelaide and the first railway in South Australia. He was treasurer in the Richard Hanson ministry from June 1858 to May 1860 and at the new election in that year was, with John Dunn one of the representatives for Mount Barker.

1864 expedition to the Northern Territory 

In 1864 the South Australian government, desiring to open up the Northern Territory, organised a survey party under Finniss, appointing him as the Government Resident of the Northern Territory and giving him instructions to examine the Adelaide River and the coastline to the west and east of it. Finniss chose a site, Escape Cliffs, near the mouth of the Adelaide River for the settlement, but his choice was much criticised. He had problems with insubordination of his officers, who were jealous of the attention he paid to some of the lesser ranks (notably W. P. Auld and J. W. O. Bennett); nor was he popular with the men, who had expected to spend time exploring and not as much on tedious duties such as keeping guard on the stores; he had not secured adequate supplies for the expedition; and did not enjoy good relations with the local Aboriginal people. 

On 9 August 1864, during one of Finniss's absences, James Manton sent a party on horseback to recover stores which had been plundered by local Aboriginals. When approaching their camp, they were surrounded by spear-carrying warriors, who injured a horse and several men, William Pearson quite seriously. Fellow-riders Fred Litchfield and Dyer removed Pearson from the scene, and when a second party arrived on foot, the Aborigines scattered, but one man was shot dead by Alaric Ward.

A month later the Aborigines mounted another raiding party, spearing several horses, which created a great deal of anger in the depot. Finniss put his son Frederick in charge of an armed party sent out to Chambers Bay (some  distant) to assert some kind of order (Finniss's instructions were not published). Dr. Francis Goldsmith, who, apart from his medical duties, had been appointed Protector of Aborigines, demanded a place in the party, but was ordered by Finniss to remain at the depot. The blacks fled their camp, but one unarmed old man named Dombey was shot in the back. Having recovered whatever property they could, the party then set fire to their dwellings. Returning to the depot, they were regaled as conquering heroes and each treated to a tot of rum. On 20 September Finniss appointed his son clerk-in-charge and accountant, in place of Ebenezer Ward, whom Finniss had suspended for disloyalty. Auld was charged with the murder.

In May 1865 a dissident party of seven men fled to Champion Bay, Western Australia, in a small boat dubbed the Forlorn Hope, and Finniss was eventually recalled. He was called before a Parliamentary Commission in May 1866 and answered his critics point by point, supported with a printed pamphlet, to the consternation of influential financier Frank Rymill, a major critic.

Other interests

Finniss was on the board of at least one business, the Duryea Mining Company, where he was Chairman of Directors from 1862.

In 1860 he published a martial anthem The Gathering : A War Song of Australia, and a love song Canst thou not read the mute Appeal ?; both set to music by Mrs. A. J. Murray.

Late life

In 1875, he was a member of the forest board and in the following year was acting auditor general. He retired from the government service in 1881, and spent his leisure in preparing an interesting but rambling Constitutional History of South Australia (1886). He died on 24 December 1893, aged 86, and is buried at the West Terrace Cemetery.

Family
Finniss was twice married and left a widow, a son and two daughters. He married Anne Frances Rogerson on 13 August 1835; she died on 3 January 1858. On 3 May 1878 he married Sophia Florence Maud Lynch. His eldest daughter Fanny Lipson Finniss (later Morgan) was the first European girl born in South Australia, on 31 December 1836 or 1 January 1837. Finniss's employee James Hoare was father of the first boy, on 7 November 1836.

Finniss married Anne Frances Rogerson (1819–1858) on 13 August 1835 at St. Audoen's, Dublin, Ireland
Fanny Lipson Finniss (1837–1865) married Frederick George Morgan (1826–1900)
Boyle Travers Nixon Finniss (1839–1853)
Julia Howard Finnis (1840–1918)
William Charles Maxwell Finniss (1842–1919)
Emily Anne Finniss (1844–1929)
Henry John Finniss (1845–1846)
Frederick Robe Finniss (1847–1908) accompanied his father to Escape Cliffs in 1864
Married Sophia Florence Maud Lynch (1852–1925) 3 May 1878 at St Matthew's Church, Kensington, South Australia
Coraly Newton Maud Finniss (1884–1890)
Ethel Maude Mary Finniss (1890–1976)

Legacy
The Finniss River in South Australia and Finniss River in the Northern Territory are both named after him, along with Finniss Springs, Northern Territory, and the South Australian Electoral district of Finniss.

Finniss Street, in North Adelaide was one of the dozens of street names chosen by the Street Naming Committee around 1840 to commemorate people of importance to the founding of Adelaide. Boyle Street and Finniss Street in the Adelaide suburbs of Marion and Oaklands Park came around 1856.

The township Queen's Own Town was renamed Finniss in 1940.

References

Further reading

External links
SA Parliament – Finniss
Northern Territory History

|-

|-

|-

|-

|-

| -

| -

1807 births
1893 deaths
People born at sea
Premiers of South Australia
Administrators of South Australia
Government Resident of the Northern Territory
56th Regiment of Foot officers
Graduates of the Royal Military College, Sandhurst
88th Regiment of Foot (Connaught Rangers) officers
English emigrants to colonial Australia
South Lancashire Regiment officers
Settlers of South Australia
Treasurers of South Australia
Burials at West Terrace Cemetery
19th-century Australian politicians
19th-century Australian public servants
Australian surveyors
Members of the South Australian House of Assembly
Members of the South Australian Legislative Council